Yachting is the use of recreational boats and ships called yachts for racing or cruising. Yachts are distinguished from working ships mainly by their leisure purpose. "Yacht" derives from the Dutch word jacht ("hunt"). With sailboats, the activity is called sailing, and with motorboats, it is called powerboating.

Racing

History
The history of sailing dates back to prehistoric times but the racing of sailing boats is believed to have started in the Netherlands some time in the 17th century. Soon, in England, custom-built racing "yachts" began to emerge. In 1851, the Royal Yacht Squadron in Cowes challenged the American yacht America. The race took place in the Solent. The America won the race and took the trophy, the America's Cup, back to the US where, held by the New York Yacht Club, it remained until 1983. The cup was then lost to the Royal Perth Yacht Club of Australia, which entered the Australia II into the contest. Meanwhile, yacht racing continued to evolve, with the development of recognised classes of racing yachts, from small dinghies up to huge maxi yachts.

Inshore
Although there are many different types of racing vessels, they can generally be separated into the larger yachts, which are larger and contain facilities for extended voyages, and smaller harbour racing craft such as dinghies and skiffs. Smaller boats are not generally referred to as yachts, although all recreational boats (as opposed to commercial or military vessels) are yachts. These days, yacht racing is a common participant sport around the developed world, particularly where favorable wind conditions and access to reasonably sized bodies of water are available. Most yachting is conducted in salt water, but smaller craft can be raced on lakes and even large rivers.

Ocean
Larger yachts are also raced on harbours, but the most prestigious yacht races are point-to-point long-distance races on the open ocean. Bad weather makes even finishing such races a considerable test of equipment and willpower, and from time to time boats and sailors are lost at sea. The longest such events are "round-the-world" races which can take months to complete, but better-known are events such as the Fastnet race in the United Kingdom and the Sydney to Hobart Yacht Race along the east coast of Australia. Large races are usually organized with a first-past-the-post trophy (called "line honours") and under a handicap system that adjusts finishing times for the relative speeds of the boats' design, theoretically offering each entrant an equal chance.

While sailing groups organize the most active and popular competitive yachting, other boating events are also held worldwide: speed motor boat racing; competitive canoeing, kayaking, and rowing; and navigational contests (generally a test of celestial and landmark-based navigation skills where GPS and other electronic navigation equipment is disallowed) are among the events which are organized around the world. Specialized yachts, such as hydrofoils, hovercraft, or personal watercraft also engage in competitions involving test of equipment and skill (usually, skill in maneuvering safely). All such events are part of the larger world of yachting, if they are done for recreational or sporting purposes.

Cruising

Cruising involves traveling on a boat, whether across a bay, on the Great Lakes (in the US) or from island to island in the South Pacific. Safe cruising across long distances requires a degree of self-sufficiency and a wide range of skills beyond handling the boat. Knowledge of topics such as navigation, meteorology, mechanical and electrical systems, radio, first aid, sea survival, nutrition and more are needed and can be life saving when cruising to distant shores. In the US, the United States Power Squadrons offer courses and certifications in these skills. In the UK, a system of certification is run by the Royal Yachting Association. Similar systems are offered by organizations in other countries and typically include a range of courses, both theoretical and practical.

See also
Boating
Classic Boat Museum
Cruising (maritime)
Superyacht
Sailing
Yacht charter
Yacht club
Yacht racing
Yacht rock

References

External links 

 
Sports originating in the Netherlands

fr:Nautisme